Tanintharyi Line is a  gauge railway line in Myanmar's southernmost region, Tanintharyi Region, operated by Myanmar Railways.  The line runs from Mawlamyine Railway Station (Moulmein) to the Dawei area, with connections to Yangon Central Railway Station, it is under construction extending towards Myeik from the current terminus of Thayetchaung Station, which lies just after Dawei Station.  Current section in operation includes the part from Mawlamyaing Station to Thayetchaung.  It is expected to become a part of a pan-Asian railway network, allowing spur connections specifically to Thailand.  A spur connection (95 km as the crow flies) between the SRT rail head at Nam Tok Station in Kanchanaburi Province to Dawei Station through mountains is planned by Thai interests backed by Japanese funding, though other rail connections are certainly possible.  Until then, there is an air bridge in the north end with Nok Air flights from Mae Sot Airport, Thailand to Mawlamyaing to bypass rough and politically conflicted overland connections.

History
1994 saw the start of construction of the initially isolated  Ye-Dawei (Tavoy) railway, completed March 1998. This was later joined to the route north at Ye by the new  road/rail bridge across the Ye River, opened November 2003.
In April 2008, the tracks were extended across the   Thanlwin Bridge, a road/rail bridge located in Moulmein, provision having been made in its design when it was opened a few years earlier. This allowed the long isolated section south to Ye and later Dawei (Tavoy) to receive trains from the north of the country.  A 20 mile extension to Thayetchaung Station was opened to traffic in June 2011.

Stations
 Yangon Central Railway Station via Mawlamyaing Station.
Thanlwin River Bridge (Mawlamyaing Bridge)
(24) Mawlamyaing (Old Station) 178
(25) Mawlamyaing 182 1/4
(26) Kawt Kha Ni 185 3/4
(27) Hpar Auk 189
(28) Hmein Ga Nein 194
(29) Mudon 197 1/2
(30) Taw Ku 202 1/2
(31) Ka Mar Wet 206
(32) Ka Lawt Thawt 209
(33) Kun Hlar 213 1/2
(34) Thanbyuzayat 217 1/4 (Junction to Payathonzu)
(35) Pa Nga 223 1/4
(36) Ka Yoke Pi 226
(37) An Khe 229 1/2
(38) Htin Shu 233 1/2
(39) Ah Nin 239 1/2	
(40) Hnit Kayin 246
(41) Lamaing 252
(42) Taung Bon 258
(43) Paing Wan 261 1/4	
(44) Pa Yan Maw -
(45) Pa Laing Kee 266 1/4
(46) Ye 271 1/2
Ye River Bridge
(47) Chaung Taung 272/11 (with very small ? Ø 20 feet turntable)
(48) Kalawt Kyi -
(49) Koe Maing 279/19
(50) Pauk Pin Kwin 288/5
(51) Nat Kyi Zin 296/23
(52) Sein Bon 299.62
(53) Yae Ngan Gyi 301.77
(54) Sin Swei 303.17
(55) Min Tha 308/22
(56) Hsin Ku 309.70
(57) Ein Da Ra Za 318/22
(58) Gan Gaw Taung 320
(59) In Hpya -
(60) Kalein-Aung 333/0
(61) Yae Pone -
(62) Hein Ze 341/20
(63) Tha Ke Kwa 350/6
(64) Dauk Lauk -
(65) Yebyu 362/19
(66) Nyin Htway 365/13
(67) Maung Mei Shaung 368/?
(68) Za Har 371/0
(69) Dawei 373/12
 Thayetchaung Station 393

Under construction
 Myeik Station

References

Metre gauge railways in Myanmar